Abbecourt may refer to:
 Abbecourt, Oise, a commune in the department of Oise, France
 Abbécourt, a commune in the department of Aisne, France